Mauro Ghiozzi (born 27 February 2002) is an Italian football player. He plays for Alessandria.

Club career
He made his Serie B debut for Alessandria on 19 March 2022 in a game against Ternana.

References

External links
 

2002 births
Living people
Italian footballers
Association football midfielders
U.S. Alessandria Calcio 1912 players
Serie B players